Collins Creek is a  long 3rd order tributary to the Haw River, in Chatham and Orange Counties, North Carolina.

Course
Collins Creek rises at Dodsons Crossroads in Orange County, North Carolina and then flows south into Chatham County to the Haw River about 2 miles east of Mandale, North Carolina.

Watershed
Collins Creek drains  of area, receives about 47.3 in/year of precipitation, and has a wetness index of 437.59 and is about 67% forested.

See also
List of rivers of North Carolina

References

Additional Maps

Rivers of North Carolina
Rivers of Chatham County, North Carolina
Rivers of Orange County, North Carolina